The Széchenyi Prize, named after István Széchenyi, is a prize given in Hungary by the state, replacing the former State Prize in 1990 in recognition of those who have made an outstanding contribution to academic life in Hungary.

Recipients

 Alex Szalay - 1991
 Agnes Heller - 1995
 János Kornai - 1994
 Vera T. Sós - 1997
 György Enyedi - 1998
 Miklós Laczkovich - 1998
 Thomas Molnar - 2000
 Gyula O. H. Katona - 2005
 Katalin Keserü - 2007
 Mihály Simai - 2007
 András Szőllősy - 2007
 László Lovász - 2008
 András Jánossy - 2009
 Mária Augusztinovics – 2010
 András Sárközy - 2010
 Mihaly Csikszentmihalyi - 2011
 László Lénárd - 2011
 Lajos Pósa - 2011
 Gábor Stépán - 2011
 Endre Szemerédi (2012)
 György Kéri - 2013
 Telegdy Gyula - 2014
 Mária Schmidt, Miklós Simonovits -
 Péter Erdő, Miklós Maróth (2016)
 Béla Bollobás (2017)
 Katalin Karikó (2021)
 András Perczel (2021)

References

External links
www.okm.gov.hu 

Hungarian awards